Tuula may refer to:

People
 Tuula Haatainen (born 1960), Finnish politician
 Tuula Hovi (born 1939), Finnish orienteering competitor
 Tuula Kallioniemi (born 1951), Finnish author
 Tuula Laaksalo (born 1953), Finnish javelin thrower
 Tuula Puputti (born 1977), Finnish ice hockey player
 Tuula Rautanen (born 1942), Finnish sprinter
 Tuula Teeri (born 1957), Finnish molecular geneticist
 Tuula Tenkanen (born 1990), Finnish sailor
 Tuula Vilkas (born 1950), Finnish speed skater
 Tuula Väätäinen (born 1955), Finnish politician
 Tuula Yrjölä, Finnish diplomat

Places
 Tuula, Estonia

Other
 Tuula (comic)

Finnish feminine given names